Fast and Loose is a British television series which was broadcast on BBC Two in 2011. Conceived by Dan Patterson, one of the creators of the TV series Whose Line Is It Anyway?, it mirrors the series in format and style with the addition of some new games. Guests take part in improvised sketches in which each comedian inhabits a certain character or film genre. The only series was eight episodes long and hosted by comedian Hugh Dennis. Fast and Loose is the inspiration for the 2012 American show Trust Us with Your Life on ABC, hosted by Fred Willard and featuring a celebrity guest on each episode.

Format
The style and format was similar to Channel 4's Whose Line Is It Anyway? and Mock the Week both of which are also produced by Dan Patterson. Each episode had six performers, with an additional guest performer for one of the sketches.

Games
Forward/Rewind: Participants are given a scenario to act out and the host may call out "forward" or "rewind" as he pleases while the players must follow accordingly.
Interpretive dance: A player (usually David Armand) will mime out a popular song while the other participants are wearing mufflers and must guess what song it is.
Double Speak Game: A pair of players (who talk either in unison or saying every other word) acts as an expert on a topic suggested by the audience while another pair (with the opposite restrictions) is either interviewing or learning from the first pair.
Sideways Scene: Players must act out a scene while lying on the floor. The camera is positioned from the ceiling, thereby giving viewers the illusion that the players are in an upright position. When Whose Line is it Anyway? was revived on The CW in 2013, Sideways Scene was added to its game rotation.

Episodes

External links

2011 British television series debuts
2011 British television series endings
2010s British satirical television series
BBC television comedy
Improvisational television series
English-language television shows